John Kenyon Holden (7 September 1910 – 15 December 1976) was an Australian rules footballer who played with St Kilda and Geelong in the Victorian Football League (VFL).

Notes

External links 

1910 births
1976 deaths
Australian rules footballers from Melbourne
St Kilda Football Club players
Geelong Football Club players
People from Richmond, Victoria